Shearjashub Spooner (December 3, 1809 – March 14, 1859) was an American physician and writer.

Born in Brandon, Vermont, he graduated as a physician in Middlebury in 1830 and New York City, in 1835, he became a dentist in New York.

He retired in 1858, and died in Plainfield, New Jersey.

Works 
 Guide to Sound Teeth (New York, 1836)
 Art of Manufacturing Mineral Teeth (1837)
 Treatise on Surgical and Mechanical Dentistry (1838)
 Anecdotes of Painters, Engravers, Sculptors, and Architects, and Curiosities of Art (3 volumes, 1853)
  (1853; new edition, 2 volumes, 1865)

External links 
 
 
 Biographical and family information

1809 births
1859 deaths
American dentists
People from Brandon, Vermont
Writers from Vermont
Writers from New York City
American male writers
19th-century dentists